The Last Hour is a 1921 German silent film directed by Dimitri Buchowetzki and starring Reinhold Schünzel, Charlotte Ander and Maria Orska.

The film's sets were designed by the art director Hanns Otto.

Cast
 Reinhold Schünzel
 Charlotte Ander
 Emil Biron
 Hanne Brinkmann
 Sadjah Gezza
 Maria Orska
 Ernst Pröckl

References

Bibliography
 Bock, Hans-Michael & Bergfelder, Tim. The Concise CineGraph. Encyclopedia of German Cinema. Berghahn Books, 2009.

External links

1921 films
Films of the Weimar Republic
German silent feature films
Films directed by Dimitri Buchowetzki
German black-and-white films
1920s German films